Petite-Île (literally Little Isle) is a commune on the French island and department of Réunion. The commune is bordered by the communes of Saint-Joseph to the east and Saint-Pierre to the west. The commune gets its name from the uninhabited islet off of its coast, the only such islet near Réunion that has vegetation. The commune was established in 1935.

Geography

Climate
Petite-Île has a tropical monsoon climate (Köppen climate classification Am).

Population

Economy
The main economy in the commune is agriculture-based, with cane sugar plantations, along with fruit and vegetable farming.

See also
Communes of the Réunion department

References

External links
 Official website 
  Site of the CIVIS 

Petite ile